Kotoni Staggs (born 29 October 1998) is a Tonga international rugby league footballer who plays as a  for the Brisbane Broncos in the NRL.

He has represented Indigenous All Stars, Tonga and New South Wales. Staggs is a child of three. His sister Kaneesha Staggs is currently 17 who plays rugby for the reds and has just been selected to play for the Australian Rugby side. 
Staggs has faced and acl injury which he recovered from however he know recovery’s from a meniscus injury.

Background
Staggs was born in Wellington, New South Wales, Australia and is of Indigenous Australian (Wiradjuri people) and Tongan descent. He was educated at Wellington High School.

He played his junior football for the Wellington Cowboys before being signed by the Brisbane Broncos.

Playing career

2017

Staggs played for the Broncos Holden Cup team in 2017, playing 25 games, scoring 12 tries and kicking 23 goals. Staggs was rewarded for his season winning the Broncos U20s Best Back of The Year Award.

2018
After showing great form in the Under 20's, Staggs was promoted up to the Queensland Cup, playing for the Redcliffe Dolphins. Staggs was showing great performances for the Dolphins in the early rounds, bouncing between Centre and Second-Row, his versatility catching the eye of Broncos coach Wayne Bennett to include him into the full-time squad.

In the lead-up to the Broncos clash against the Sydney Roosters in Round 11 of the 2018 NRL season, Staggs was selected to make his NRL debut for the Brisbane Broncos off the interchange bench after Bennett originally selected young centre Gehamat Shibasaki for the bench role but went with Staggs instead before his versatility to play in the backs and forwards.
 
During the match, after Broncos fill in centre Tom Opacic suffered a concussion in only the second minute, Staggs come on to cover as centre and had an impressive debut, scoring a try, setting up a try for winger Corey Oates, running for 57 metres, made nine tackles and recorded five tackle busts during the Broncos thrilling 28-22 win at Suncorp Stadium.

In the lead-up to the Broncos clash with the New Zealand Warriors, after Broncos gun centre James Roberts was ruled out of the match from an Achilles tendon injury, Staggs was denied by a flaw in the NRL by not allowing him to start at centre because he wasn't included in the Broncos top 32 squad at the start of the season, so Jaydn Su'A had to start at centre but broke his ankle during the Broncos 26-6 unimpressing loss at Suncorp Stadium.

Staggs would finish his debut NRL season with him playing in 9 matches and scoring 2 tries for the Broncos in the 2018 NRL season.

When Staggs wasn't selected for the Broncos, he would play his trade in the Queensland Cup, showing more great form and which the Dolphins would make the 2018 Queensland Cup Grand Final, playing against the Easts Tigers, scoring a try and kicking 6 goals in the 36-22 win at Suncorp Stadium.

On 13 October 2018, Staggs was selected to play for the Junior Kangaroos against the Junior Kiwis, playing at second-row in the 40-24 win at Mt Smart Stadium.

2019
On 15 February 2019, Staggs represented the Indigenous All Stars against the New Zealand Maori All Stars team, playing off the interchange bench in the 34-14 win at AAMI Park.
On July 7, 2019, Staggs kicked 4 conversions from 4 attempts in the "Baby Broncos"' crucial 2-point win over the Cronulla-Sutherland Sharks in round 16.

Staggs made 24 appearances for Brisbane in the 2019 NRL season as the club finished 8th on the table and qualified for the finals.  Staggs played in the club's elimination final against Parramatta which Brisbane lost 58-0 at the new Western Sydney Stadium.  The defeat was the worst in Brisbane's history and also the biggest finals defeat in history.

2020
Staggs made 14 appearances for Brisbane in the 2020 NRL season.  He finished as the club's top try scorer and top points scorer in a disappointing year as they finished last on the table and claimed the wooden spoon for the first time in their history.

2021
In round 20 of the 2021 NRL season, Staggs scored two tries for Brisbane in a 37-18 victory over arch-rivals North Queensland.
On 31 July, Staggs was ruled out for the remainder of the season with an MCL injury.

2022
On 29 May, Staggs was selected by New South Wales to play in game one of the 2022 State of Origin series.
On 19 June, Staggs was not selected by New South Wales for the second game in the series after the blues had lost the opening game 16-10.
Staggs played a total of 23 games for Brisbane in the 2022 NRL season as the club finished 9th on the table.

2023
In round 3 of the 2023 NRL season, Staggs scored two tries for Brisbane in a 40-18 victory over St. George Illawarra.

Honours

Individual
Brisbane Broncos U20s Best Back: 2017
Brisbane Broncos Play of The Year: 2020 (His second half try against the Dragons in Round 15)
Brisbane Broncos Best Back: 2019, 2020

Controversy
On 4 August 2020, a sex tape was released featuring Staggs. In a statement made by the Brisbane Broncos, it was reported that it was made without Staggs's consent. "The Brisbane Broncos have been made aware of a video recording involving Kotoni Staggs being circulated on social media," the statement read. "The video is of a highly personal nature and has been released without his consent. The club is working closely with the NRL Integrity Unit, having alerted it as soon as becoming aware of the issue."

On 8 June 2021, Staggs was fined $20,000 and suspended for two matches by the NRL over an off-field incident that occurred in April 2021.

References

External links

Brisbane Broncos profile

1998 births
Australian rugby league players
Australian sportspeople of Tongan descent
Indigenous Australian rugby league players
Indigenous All Stars players
Tonga national rugby league team players
Brisbane Broncos players
Redcliffe Dolphins players
Rugby league centres
Rugby league second-rows
Rugby league players from New South Wales
Wiradjuri people
Living people